Atom Rock is an insular rock  northeast of Rambler Island in the Bragg Islands, lying in Crystal Sound off the west coast of Graham Land. It was mapped from surveys by the Falkland Islands Dependencies Survey (1958–59), and named by the UK Antarctic Place-Names Committee in association with Bragg Islands.

References
 

Rock formations of Graham Land
Loubet Coast